Stichoneuron is a genus in the family Stemonaceae erected in 1883.

Stichoneuron is native to Assam, Bangladesh, Myanmar, Thailand, and Peninsular Malaysia.

 Species
 Stichoneuron bognerianum Duyfjes - Johor
 Stichoneuron calcicola Inthachub - southern Thailand
 Stichoneuron caudatum Ridl. - Thailand, Peninsular Malaysia
 Stichoneuron halabalense Inthachub - southern Thailand, Peninsular Malaysia
 Stichoneuron membranaceum Hook.f. - Assam, Bangladesh, Myanmar

References

Pandanales genera
Stemonaceae
Taxa named by Joseph Dalton Hooker